Karungali is a 2011 Tamil-language film written and directed by Kalanjiyam and produced by Vivekanandan. The film stars the director himself alongside Srinivas, Anjali, and Sunitha Verma in the lead roles, while Asmitha and Alex play supporting roles. The music was composed by Srikanth Deva, while editing was done by LVK Doss. The film released on 29 July 2011 and became a critical and commercial failure.

Plot
Dr. Kanimozhi (Sunitha Verma) is drawn to Pottalam Ravi (Kalanjiyam) because of his life-saving act and ultimately decides to marry him. She overlooks Ravi's brutal past life, during when he had murdered many, including Sengudi (Asmitha), who was with him right from their childhood days. She loves him, but he appears quite satisfied by using her whenever he is driven by his sexual urge. Believing that she could change him for the better, Kani marries him after his return from prison after a jail term. Ravi looks like a changed man after emerging from jail and tells his wife that the talks that he had with some religious people made him a complete man. However, his real self comes out when he hears about Kani's good-looking patient Amudhanila Gunasekharan (Anjali) and her "inability" to give birth to a child. Ravi's evil mind springs back to life as his urge to have sex with Amudha increases. He gets close to her, pretending to be the doctor's assistant. Ravi almost succeeds in making Amudha believe that he had the "solution" to "cure" her problem. How Amudha is saved and how Kani treats her sex-maniac husband is what the script is all about.

Cast
 Kalanjiyam as Pottalam Ravi
 Srinivas as Guna
 Anjali as Amudhanila Gunasekharan
 Sunitha Varma as Dr. Kanimozhi
 Asmitha as Sengudi
 Alex

Soundtrack
Soundtrack was composed by Srikanth Deva. Lyrics written by Ilaya Kamban, Ma. Pugazhenthi and Erodu Iraivan.

Reception
The film opened to unanimously poor reviews, with a critic noting that the film was a "crude affair", citing that the "subject in question is too heavy and has been handled in an insensitive way, making the film come across as a cheap, sex thriller." The film was later dubbed and released in Telugu as Sathi Leelavathi, with the director crediting himself under the name Prabhakaran.

References

2011 films
2010s Tamil-language films
Films scored by Srikanth Deva
Films directed by Kalanjiyam